Fedorchenko is a Ukrainian surname. Notable people with the surname include:

 Aleksey Fedorchenko (born 1966), Russian film director
 Artem Fedorchenko (born 1980), Ukrainian footballer
 Sergei Fedorchenko (born 1974), Kazakhstani gymnast

See also
 

Ukrainian-language surnames